Stan Honda is an American photojournalist.

Honda's first job as a professional photojournalist, following working as a volunteer photojournalist at the Krampus newspaper of the University of California at San Diego, was a 1981 gig at the Daily Californian.
Since then Honda has been employed by numerous publications, including:
the San Diego Union Tribune,
the Los Angeles Times,
New York Newsday,
The National Post, and 
Agence France-Presse.

Honda is also an amateur Astronomer, who has given lectures on photographing the night sky.

In 2005 the journal Visual Resources published a special issue devoted to "Photojournalism, Mass Media and the Politics of Spectacle".
An interview with Honda formed an eight-page chapter of this issue of the journal.  That interview focussed on Honda's photos of the after-effects on the World Trade Center attack, his photos of survivors the World War 2 internment of those of Japanese descent, and of his photos while embedded with American soldiers during the 21st century American invasion and occupation of Iraq.

Honda is known for capturing one of the most iconic images of the aftereffects of al Qaeda's attacks of September 11, 2001, the "dust lady", a survivor of the collapse of the World Trade Center, so completely covered in white dust, that a viewer would have to look twice to recognize that Marcy Borders was African-American.

In March 2015 Honda wrote under his own byline, when he described his trip to the remote Arctic Island of Svalbard to record a rare total solar eclipse.

Honda produced a VHS narrative of a selection of some of iconic images, entitled "Eyewitness: Stan Honda - Reflections of a Photojournalist."

References

American photojournalists
American male journalists
American journalists of Asian descent
American writers of Japanese descent
Living people
Year of birth missing (living people)